The International Ornithological Committee (IOC) recognizes these 72 species of herons, egrets, and bitterns in the family Ardeidae.  They are distributed among 18 genera, some of which have only one species. Six extinct species are included; they are marked (X).

List
This list is presented according to the IOC taxonomic sequence and can also be sorted alphabetically by common name and binomial.

References